Pyogenesis is a German metal band based in Stuttgart that played different genres of music such as death metal, alternative metal, punk rock, and gothic metal, which they were credited for their part in originating the latter genre in the early 1990s.

History

Foundation 

Pyogenesis originated from the local band Immortal Hate and singer and guitarist Flo V. Schwarz in mid 1991. The band members met in Rockfabrik, a club in the wider area of Stuttgart, Germany, that covered all rock and metal styles. The owners gave the yet young grindcore and death metal scene a place, similar to children's disco on Sunday afternoon 3 pm to 9 pm. At that time innumerable bands of the genre were found there, some of them became pretty big. Pyogenesis released their first 7" Single 'Rise of the unholy' on the Mexican label Mephitic Productions. The recordings were previously released as the band's first demo tape. Short time later the second single, 'Sacrificious Profanity' with new recordings was released on Symphonies of Death Records from Colombia. Of both singles, only 1,000 each were available and due to the band's deep entanglement in the underground scene, these first issues were sold out just within weeks. But due to its success, there were rereleases, which were marked as such.

1992: Ignis Creatio 

In just five days, late September and early October 1992 the debut album Ignis Creatio to be released on the French label Osmose Productions was recorded and mixed. Containing four songs plus an outro and a total playing time of just 31 minutes it was a mini EP, nevertheless it was marketed and sold to the same price as a full-length album. The development of the music included both, clear and guttural vocals for the very first time. It was released on 12-inch vinyl and CD in Europe and from 1993 on also on tape in America.

1993–1995: Sweet X-Rated Nothings and Waves of Erotasia 

Late 1993 the band recorded the album 'Sweet X-Rated Nothings', that Nuclear Blast were quite interested in. Both record companies were able to agree on a switch and Pyogenesis signed with Nuclear Blast. But the first joint release was the mini EP 'Waves of Erotasia' with its total playing time of 15 Minutes, which came out on 25 February 1994 on cassette and CD in North America and Europe. Both mini EP releases include the Order of the Garter's crest with its banderole 'Honi soit qui mal y pense'.

The band's first co-headlining tour with British Anathema and the Finnish support God Forsaken through Europe happened in January 1994. In November the first full-length album 'Sweet X-Rated Nothings' was released. Nuclear Blast changed their distribution-structure so this was one of the first releases on the label that was not distributed through SPV but Warner Music in the German speaking territories. The band's trademark, the clean vocals came more and more to the fore. They played bigger events such as a concert for the German Music television VIVA TV at the music trade fare Popkomm, before in March 1995, they completed a two-week tour through the former Eastern bloc, among others in countries such as the back then newly founded Czech Republic. The German magazine Rock Hard had a journalist on this tour and released a four-pages article about it.

In April 1995 the band played in Mexico for the very first time, where they already made up a reputation by entering the national import-charts on number 1. On the show, fans were jumping of a  gallery onto the audience, so the band had to interrupt the show, but continued after the situation was clear.

1995: Twinaleblood 
Despite numerous open-air shows – among others the Wacken Open Air, the world's biggest metal-fest – they recorded in the band's own studio the follow-up album 'Twinaleblood'. The recordings were mixed at the Impulse Studios, Hamburg and mastered at the famous Home Studios, where they met Rammstein for the first time, who were busy with taping their first record.

Before the release of record, Pyogenesis travelled to Berlin to record the song 'Son of Fate' with Harris Johns exclusively for the 'Death is just the beginning…' compilation and switched to the major label Warner Music. On 1 December 'Twinaleblood finally was released, also available as digipak and gatefold-vinyl that became collectors items, to be seen on eBay for premium prices.

The album achieved best marks in international media, e.g. No. 2 in Rock Hard Magazine, saying 'one of the most varying and entertaining records of the year!'. Along with the release, the band was touring  months through all relevant countries in Europe, followed by a festival tour and some headliner club shows. Both singles 'Twinaleblood' and 'Addiction Pole' had video clips, that were shot in the mountains of Luxembourg and around Trier and got airplay on MTV.

1996–1997: Unpop 

Immediately the band started to work on 'Twinaleblood's follow-up album. A serious touch of alternative-music could be found in these 19 recordings that were produced in February 1996 in the band's own studio. The material was used for two different releases. The first one, 'Love Nation Sugarhead' mini-EP, came out 18 October 1996 and had 6 songs, whereof 4 were not released on the album. The title-track's video clip gained serious interest in all relevant music-TV-channels. Due to its success a remix for the American market was made by King Britt and Josh Wink, two worldwide respected DJs, who have been already working for Depeche Mode or Moby. Flo V. Schwarz was flown in to Philadelphia to rerecord the vocals for it, at the end of the year. The remix was released as a 12" maxi and became a collectors item.

To gain interest on the forthcoming album, Pyogenesis played a tour with Social Distortion, late 1996 and released 'Unpop' in January 1997. VIVA TV had them to perform two songs live every day for a whole week. The front cover which showed lead singer Flo V. Schwarz naked with a guitar in front of his private parts, had to be changed for the US American market, because the distributor would not work with this artwork.

Among numerous club-shows and festivals the highlights of the following summer was an open-air concert in Hungary with an audience of more than 560,000 and the German Rheinkultur with 120.000 visitors. At the last-named singer Flo V. Schwarz encouraged the audience to throw drenched soil to the stage, after it had rained for two full days, which led to an interruption of the event and the festival promoter filed a charge of mass-vandalism and wanted 50.000 Deutsch mark for the crop damage. The newspaper Bonner Rundschau headlined 'From Rhein-culture to mud-culture'.

1998: Mono ... or will it ever be the way it used to be 
During 1998 Pyogenesis started to work on the fourth full-length album, which was produced at the legendary Woodhouse Studios by Siggi Bemm. The band just interrupted the recordings for the twin-festivals Rock Am Ring and Rock Im Park, where they headlined the NTF stage and a concert at the Bizarre Festival. On 2 November 'Mono ... or will it ever be the way it used to be' was released and given best marks by the press, such as Visions Magazine who put them on number 2 of the editors charts and wrote about it 'It's the sunshine, the first kiss, the butterflies in your stomach, just beautiful. And the best about it, this record will remain!' Also the video clip 'Drive Me Down' got worldwide airplay. Tim Eiermann and Wolfgang Maier left Pyogenesis after they had earlier this year joined the project Liquido with which they achieved higher chart-positions.

1999–2000: P ... or different songs in different sounds 
Pyogenesis were touring relentlessly the next three and a half years through all Europe with up to 140 tour dates a year. In some countries they played for the very first time, such as Principality of Liechtenstein or Bulgaria, where they headlined a festival in the city center of Sofia with more than 25,000 attendees. A lot of footage of these touring-years can be seen on the home video the band released in Summer 2000. Pyogenesis started a three-day fan-travel along with the release of the home video, where 50 dedicated fans and the band members were driving in a coach from spot to spot, such as a visit of the editorial office of the Visions Magazine, a concert in an abandoned mining pit or the recording of a TV show with the band.

2000–2002 
Nuclear Blast wanted to release a best of album, which did not meet the band's perception, so both parties agreed on a remix album titled 'P … or different songs in different sounds', which was released 24 July 2000. The Billboard Magazin, publisher of the US American record-sales charts, did not consider the album as a regular remix album, cause the band themselves also rerecorded a few tracks. From 1999 on Pyogenesis were working on 28 new songs, which were recorded in Summer 2001, again at the Woodhouse Studios, produced by Flo V. Schwarz and Siggi Bemm. Fans were allowed to listen to some song snippets and vote in order to affect the track listing of the record.

2002: She makes me wish I had a gun and I feel sexy 

In 2002 Flo V. Schwarz founded the label Hamburg Records. He had been working at Nuclear Blast for many years and achieved the expertise needed for such an undertaking. On 7 May 2002, the five-track EP 'I feel Sexy' was released, followed by the full-length album 'She Makes Me Wish I Had A Gun' on 3 June. Despite the change of music, that took place over the years, the media of all kinds of genres, the band has been passing, were reviewing the record with best notes, again. Metal magazine Rock Hard wrote 'I am excited about every single song of the record and believe that this 5th Pyogenesis record is the best by far! Congratulations!'. This record was the best-selling album so far.

After a suicide attack in a school in Thuringia the band was not allowed to put their tour posters in public places that showed the cover of the record, a gun lying on a red velvet pillow. The video clip of their hit-single 'Don't You Say Maybe' entered and stayed on the pole position of the viewer charts, leaving bands as Donots, Beatsteaks or Manowar behind them. But also other countries played the clip, like the biggest Russian music TV A1 put them on a higher rotation.

2003–2015 

In the next years, the band played several tours through Europe such as Germany, Benelux, former Sovjet Union States and Italy, where a fan entered the scene and was dragged to the ground by the security guards. On the way back from a festival, a tire of the band bus blew, wherefore the vehicle went head over wheels twice. There was just minor injury, even if members of the band and crew were sleeping at the time.

In 2003 Pyogenesis played co-headliner at the Summer Breeze Open Air, and delivered the first metal show in years. They used a lot of pyrotechnics such as up to 12 m high flame towers wherefore the fire service had to implement aluminum-sheets below the roof of the stage. From 2005 on the band played outside their homeland Germany, only. They were a couple of times in Russia, where they also played the very last shows in the capital Moscow and the Asian part of the country at the Russian leg of the Snowboard World Championship as the headliner in front of 25,000 people, before their concert break until 2014.

By the end of 2012 the band announced the rerelease of their first mini EP accordingly to the 20th anniversary of this record. The whole issue was sold out within just 10 days.

The work of Wolfgang Maier and Tim Eiermann with Liquido ended by their split up in 2009. Flo V. Schwarz is still running his company Hamburg Records that has been working with smaller bands up to multi platinum and #1 acts.

2015: The Steampunk Trilogy 
The band activities restarted with a comeback show in Bucharest, Romania, where the band played a sold-out show in front of 1000 fans. Jan Räthje on drums and British guitarist Gizz Butt (best known for being in The Prodigy) on lead guitar joined the band and a trilogy about the change of the society in the 19th century was released between 2015 and 2020. It consists of the chart successes "A Century In The Curse OF Time", "A Kingdom To Disappear" and "A Silent Soul Screams Loud" and is known as "The Steampunk Trilogy". In that period Pyogenesis issued much-noticed video clips in Steampunk aesthetics and toured the world.

Discography

Studio albums 
 1992: Ignis Creatio / aka "Pyogenesis" (Osmose Productions / SPV)
 1994: Sweet X-Rated Nothings (Nuclear Blast / Warner Music)
 1995: Twinaleblood ( Warner Music / Nuclear Blast)
 1997: Unpop (Nuclear Blast / Warner Music)
 1998: Mono … Or Will It Ever Be the Way It Used to Be (Nuclear Blast / Warner Music)
 2002: She Makes Me Wish I Had a Gun (Hamburg Records / Sony Music)
 2015: A Century in the Curse of Time (AFM Records)
 2017: A Kingdom to Disappear (AFM Records)
 2020: A Silent Soul Screams Loud (AFM Records)

EPs 
 1994: Waves of Erotasia (Nuclear Blast / SPV)
 1996: Love Nation Sugarhead (Nuclear Blast / Warner Music)
 2002: EP I Feel Sexy (Hamburg Records / Sony Music)

Miscellaneous 
 1991 Ode to the Churning Seas of Nar-Mataru Demo Tape
 2000 P ... the ultimate home video VHS/DVD (Nuclear Blast / Warner Music)
 2000 P ... or different songs in different sounds (Nuclear Blast / Warner Music)

Chart positions

References

External links 

 
 
 

Alternative metal musical groups
German death metal musical groups
German gothic metal musical groups
Pop punk groups
Nuclear Blast artists